Iran competed at the 2022 Winter Olympics in Beijing, China, from 4 to 20 February 2022.

Iran's team consisted of two athletes (one men and one woman) competing in alpine skiing disciplines and cross-country skiing. On January 23, 2022, alpine skiers Atefeh Ahmadi and Hossein Saveh-Shemshaki were named as the Iranian flagbearers during the opening ceremony. Meanwhile a volunteer was the flagbearer during the closing ceremony.

Competitors
The following is the list of number of competitors participating at the Games per sport/discipline.

Alpine skiing

By meeting the basic qualification standards, Iran qualified one male and one female alpine skier. On 10 February 2022, Hossein Saveh-Shemshaki became the first athlete to provide a positive test for doping at the 2022 Winter Olympics and did not compete in any events.

Cross-country skiing

By meeting the basic qualification standards, Iran qualified one male cross-country skier.

Distance

References

Nations at the 2022 Winter Olympics
2022
2022 in Iranian sport